CBUX-FM is a Canadian radio station, which broadcasts SRC's Ici Musique network at 90.9 FM in Vancouver, British Columbia.

The station broadcasts from the CBC Regional Broadcast Centre on Hamilton Street in Downtown Vancouver, while its transmitter is located atop Mount Seymour.

Programming
In fall 2010, Espace musique stations in western Canada began to air the network schedule on tape delay as appropriate for their respective time zones, in line with Radio-Canada's other terrestrial networks. Hence network programs now air on CBUX three hours after they air on Espace musique stations in Ontario, Quebec, and Atlantic Canada. At the same time, much of the daytime programming was devolved to local stations; on CBUX, Monique Polloni now hosts from 9:00 a.m. to noon, followed by Célyne Gagnon until 3:00 p.m.

In addition, André Rhéaume hosts a world music program originating from CBUX which airs across the network on Wednesday and Thursday nights, from 10:00 p.m. to 1:00 a.m. local time.

Prior to fall 2010, all Espace musique stations carried the entire network schedule simultaneously without any tape delays for time zone differences. During this era, CBUX was a partial exception: Rhéaume's program, which at the time was a two-hour jazz program which aired Monday-Thursday, aired at 5:00 p.m. local time, followed by concerts at 7:00. This was the reverse of the order on most stations (concerts at 8:00 ET, jazz at 10:00 ET).

During the 2010 Winter Olympics, CBUX broke away from the national Espace musique schedule to broadcast a special radio service titled la Radio culturelle, focusing on various cultural aspects of the games for French-language listeners.

Transmitters

References

External links
Broadcasting Decision CRTC 2002-129
 

Bux
Bux
Bux
Radio stations established in 2002
2002 establishments in British Columbia